Tarasun (also known as Arhi) is an alcoholic beverage drunk by the Buryat people of Siberia. Apart from being the national drink of Buryatia, it is also used by the Buryats in their religious ceremonies. The Buryat and his tarasun have been compared to a Scotsman and his whisky.

Constituents 
Tarasun is a "highly alcoholic colourless liquid" prepared by distillation and fermentation of a mare's milk. It is described as a form of "milk whisky".

Religious usage 

Tarasun is considered to be the "Soma" of the Buryats. Offerings of tarasun are made in almost all Buryat festivals and ceremonies including marriages and childbirth. Libations of tarasun are offered during the traditional Mongol horse-sacrifice called Tailgan. Following the sacrifice, pieces of horse meat are thrown into the fire and the people assembled recite the following invocation to their deities while partaking tarasun

Buryat shamans generally prefer tarasun to vodka for usage in religious ceremonies as they feel that tarasun is more pure as it is made with special distillation equipment which only the affluent own and hence, is not made in villages. Also, according to the Buryat religion, milk and the colour white were always associated with the pure. In recent times, however, this trend is getting reversed as tarasun is being gradually replaced by vodka. A Buryat Conference which met at Irkutsk on 15 April 1917, in the aftermath of the February Revolution, prohibited the production of tarasun for normal consumption making it a punishable offense while allowing concessions for the religious usage of tarasun.

See also
 List of Russian dishes
 Arkhi
 Kumis

Notes

Bibliography

See also 
 Soma

Buryat cuisine
Russian alcoholic drinks
Russian drinks